Albania participated in the Eurovision Song Contest 2019 in Tel Aviv, Israel, with the song "" performed by Jonida Maliqi. Prior to the contest, the song was promoted by a music video and live performances in the Netherlands, Spain and the United Kingdom.

Albania was drawn to compete in the second semi-final of the Eurovision Song Contest, which took place on 16 May 2019. Performing as number 14, the nation was announced among the top 10 entries of the second semi-final and therefore qualified to compete in the final. In the grand final on 18 May 2019, it performed as number two and placed 17th out of the 26 participating countries, scoring 90 points.

Background 

The first entry was performed by Anjeza Shahini with the song "The Image of You" finishing in the seventh place, the nation's second-highest placing to date. In , the nation qualified for the final with Eugent Bushpepa finishing in 11th place with "".

In September 2018, the national broadcaster of Albania,  (RTSH), officially confirmed Albania's participation in the Eurovision Song Contest 2019 in Tel Aviv, Israel. RTSH broadcasts the contest within Albania and organises the selection process for the nation's entry. Since its debut in 2004, it has consistently selected its entry through the long-standing competition .

Before Eurovision

Festivali i Këngës 

The competition consisted of two semi-finals on 20 and 21 December, respectively, and the grand final on 22 December 2018. The three live shows were hosted by Albanian-Canadian actress Ana Golja and Albanian television presenter Viktor Zhusti. The broadcaster had previously confirmed the nation's participation in the contest in September 2018. It opened a submission period between 16 May and 30 September 2018 for artists and composers to participate in the competition. The list of competing artists and songs was officially revealed on 17 October 2018, being shortlisted to compete in the two semi-finals of the contest.

Competing entries

Shows

Semi-finals 

The semi-finals of Festivali i Këngës took place on 20 December and 21 December 2018, and were broadcast live at 20:45 (CET) on the respective dates. The first semi-final was closed by Italy's Eurovision Song Contest 2018 representative Ermal Meta. In it, the competing artists traditionally performed in cooperation with a symphonic orchestra. During the second semi-final, the 22 acts delivered performances of the final versions of their entries as intended to be performed on the stage of the Eurovision Song Contest.

Final 

The grand final of  took place on 22 December 2018 and was broadcast live at 20:45 (CET). On the same day, prior to the live show, 14 songs competed and the winner was determined by the combination of the votes from a nine-member jury panel consisting of Agim Krajka, Arta Marku, Dorian Çene, Haig Zacharian, Olsa Toqi, Pali Kuke, Rona Nishliu, Rovena Dilo and Shpëtim Kushta. Before the end of the show, Jonida Maliqi emerged as the winner and was simultaneously announced as the Albania's representative for the 2019 Eurovision Song Contest. The results of the final are summarized in the table below:

Promotion 

A music video for "" premiered via the Eurovision Song Contest's official YouTube channel on 10 March 2019. Outside of the music video, Jonida Maliqi travelled to the Banias Nature Reserve at Mount Hermon in Israel to film her introductory postcard. In the postcard, she is seen dressed in 1950s style clothing while walking through the surroundings. Maliqi is subsequently joined by four female dancers on the edge of a waterfall, where they perform an interpretive dance choreography. For further promotion, the singer embarked on a small tour with live performances at various Eurovision Song Contest-related events, including in Amsterdam, London and Madrid.

At Eurovision 

The Eurovision Song Contest 2019 took place at Expo Tel Aviv in Tel Aviv, Israel, and consisted of two semi-finals held on the respective dates of 14 and 16 May and the grand final on 18 May 2019.

On 28 January 2019, a special allocation draw was held at the Tel Aviv Museum of Art in Tel Aviv that placed each country into one of the two semi-finals, as well as which half of the show they would perform in. Albania was placed into the second semi-final, to be held on 16 May, and was scheduled to perform in the second half of the show. Once all the competing songs for the 2019 contest had been released, the running order for the semi-finals was decided by the producers of the contest rather than through another draw, for preventing similar songs being placed next to each other. Albania was set to perform in position 14, following  and preceding . At the end of the semi-final, the nation was announced among the top 10 entries and therefore qualified to compete in the grand final.

Voting 

Voting during the three shows involved each nation awarding two sets of points from 1–8, 10 and 12: one from their professional jury and the other from televoting. Each nation's jury consisted of five music industry professionals who are citizens of the nation they represent, with their names being published before the contest to ensure transparency. This jury judged each entry based on: vocal capacity; the stage performance; the song's composition and originality; and the overall impression by the act. In addition, no member of a national jury was permitted to be related in any way to any of the competing acts in such a way that they cannot vote impartially and independently. The individual rankings of each jury member as well as the nation's televoting results were released soon after the grand final.

The tables below visualise a breakdown of points awarded to Albania in the second semi-final and final of the Eurovision Song Contest 2019, as well as by the nation on both occasions. Its juries awarded its 12 points to North Macedonia in both the semi-final and final.

Points awarded to Albania

Points awarded by Albania

Detailed voting results 
The following members comprised the Albanian jury:
 Gent Rushi (jury chairperson)pedagogue, jazz musician
 singer
 Dilan Rekasinger
 Julka Gramosinger, moderator, entertainer
 mezzo-soprano

Notes and references

Notes

References

External links 

 

2019
Countries in the Eurovision Song Contest 2019
2018
Eurovision
Eurovision